"Chiisana Mahō" is the eighth single by the Japanese rock group Stereopony. It was released on December 8, 2010, under Sony Records. The main track was the first opening theme for the anime Letter Bee Reverse.

Chart performance
The single reached number 27 on the Oricon Weekly Chart.

CD or CD+DVD track list

 Chiisana Mahō (小さな魔法 Little Magic)
 Everything OK!!!
 It's a Wild World
 Chiisana Mahō (Instrumental)

Limited pressing track list

 Chiisana Mahō (小さな魔法 Little Magic)
 Everything OK!!!
 It's a Wild World
 Chiisana Mahō (Instrumental)
 Chiisana Mahō -Opening Edition-

References

2010 singles
2010 songs
Stereopony songs
Anime songs
Song articles with missing songwriters